This is a list of Belgian Cup winning football managers.

Urbain Braems won the tournament on no less than three occasions, as he led Anderlecht to success in the 1975 final and won both the 1978 and 1983 Belgian Cup Finals with Beveren; fourteen other managers have won the title on two occasions.

Only four managers have been able to win two consecutive cups, namely Hugo Broos, Raymond Goethals, Georg Keßler and Milorad Pavić. Eight managers have won the title with two sides: Urbain Braems, Johan Boskamp, Hans Croon, Ernst Happel, Ariël Jacobs, Georges Leekens, Walter Meeuws and Michel Preud'homme.

Winning managers

By individual

By nationality

References

Managers
Belgian Cup